Juan Lombía (1806 in Zaragoza – 1851 in Madrid) was a Spanish actor, author and theatre impresario. As an author, he only remembered today for his 1808 El sitio de Zaragoza, a one-act prologue dedicated to the Dos de Mayo Uprising. As impresario at Teatro de la Cruz, he was responsible for the staging of numerous works by José Zorrilla, among them Don Juan Tenorio.

References

1806 births
1851 deaths
Spanish male stage actors
People from Zaragoza
19th-century Spanish male actors
19th-century Spanish businesspeople